Lucius Hedius Rufus Lollianus Avitus may refer to:

 Lucius Hedius Rufus Lollianus Avitus (consul 114) 
 Lucius Hedius Rufus Lollianus Avitus (consul 144)